Kriza is a Bosnian television sitcom created and written by Feđa Isović and directed by Elmir Jukić.

The first episode of the show was aired on 20 October 2013. The final, 24th episode of the sitcom was aired on 30 March 2014.

Cast
Nikola Kojo as Aleš Firdus
Enis Bešlagić as Miron Firdus
Aleksandar Seksan as Zrinko Parkaš-Kifla
Mirvad Kurić as Nedo Jeremić-Jeremija
Marija Pikić as Ema Firdus
Vanesa Glođo as Nejra Nametak
Jasna Diklić as Borka
Nikolina Jelisavac as Psychiatrist
Dragan Marinković as Jose
Tatjana Šojić as Nina Kraljevic 
Robert Krajinović as Zoran

References

External links

Bosnia and Herzegovina culture
Bosnia and Herzegovina television series
Bosnia and Herzegovina television sitcoms
2010s Bosnia and Herzegovina television series
Federalna televizija original programming